Hattie Moseley Austin (April 23, 1998) was an American chef and restaurateur. She was the founder-owner-chef of Hattie's Chicken Shack in Saratoga Springs, New York.

Personal
Hattie was born Hattie Gray in Saint Francisville, Louisiana, around 1900. Her mother, Lydia, died in childbirth. The wife of a local rabbi, Hattie Leopold, who had employed Lydia took an interest in the child and helped Hattie's father Harry raise her. Hattie was named after Mrs. Leopold.

She moved to New Orleans for school, and then to Chicago. In Chicago she went to work as a cook for the family of A.E. Staley, known as "The Starch King", founder of the corn processing company of the same name. The Staleys owned homes in Chicago, Miami, and Saratoga Springs and when they travelled Hattie accompanied them.

Hattie was married twice, first to Willie Moseley, and after his death in 1971 to Bill Austin, She had no children of her own, but took in several needy neighborhood children.

Hattie's Chicken Shack

In 1938, Moseley Austin decided to settle permanently in Saratoga Springs and opened Hattie's Chicken Shack on Federal Street, a racially mixed neighborhood, with a total investment of $33. Her specialty was a simple fried chicken recipe, although later she added other items of New Orleans cooking such as shrimp, scallops, and barbeque.

At this time Saratoga Springs was a "wide open" town with an active night life— much of it centered in the Federal Street area.  During the summer season Moseley Austin operated her restaurant around the clock, seven days a week. She catered to all classes of people from wealthy gamblers to backstretch workers from the Saratoga Race Course. She was also noted for feeding anyone who was hungry, even if they had no money to pay.

Moseley Austin operated the restaurant on Federal Street until 1968, when urban renewal wiped out the entire neighborhood. She then moved to Phila Street, where the restaurant still operates today although Moseley Austin sold it in 1993.

See also
A. E. Staley

References

External links
  "Hattie (Gray) Austin Moseley" at the National Women's History Museum

1900s births
1998 deaths
African-American chefs
Chefs from New York (state)
American women chefs
People from Saratoga Springs, New York
People from St. Francisville, Louisiana
Chefs from Louisiana
20th-century African-American women
20th-century African-American people
20th-century American women